Shasti (''Punishment'') is a Bangladeshi Bengali-language film.<ref>The Daily Star, 27 June 2004 "Tagore's Shasti goes on celluloid", Culture, accessed: 5 May 2011</ref> It is the film presented by HSBC Bank Bangladesh. It was released in 2004 all over Bangladesh.

Cast
 Ilyas Kanchan as Dukhiram
 Campa as Radha
 Riaz as Chhidam
 Purnima as Chandora
 Shahidul Alam Sachchu as Zamindar
 ATM Shansuzzaman as Teacher
 Nasrin (special appearance in song "Moirechhere Moirechhere")

Crew
 Producer: Faridur Reza Sagar (Impress Telefilm Ltd.)
 Story: Rabindra Nath Tagore (Literature)
 Script: Momtaj Uddin Ahmed
 Dialogue: Momtaj Uddin Ahmed
 Screenplay: Chashi Nazrul Islam
 Director: Chashi Nazrul Islam
 Art Director: Ashok Kumar Ghosh
 Cinematography: Majibul Haque Bhuyan
 Editing: Atikur Rahman Mallick
 Music: Imon Saha and Khandokar Nurul Alam
 Lyrics: Rabindra Nath Tagore and Mohammad Rafikuzzaman
 Background Sound: Imon Shaha
 Distributor: Impress Telefilm Ltd.

Technical details
 Format: 35 mm (color)
 Reel: 15 Pans
 Running Time: 143 minutes
 Original Language: Bengali
 Subtitle: English
 Country of Origin: Bangladesh
 Date of Theatrical Release: 2004
 Year of the Product: 2003-2004
 Technical Support: Bangladesh Film Development Corporation (BFDC)

Award and achievement

International awardsShasti won a second prize in the "Bangla Showcase" category in the 3 International Film Festival Bangladesh Award 2006.

In 2005 it was selected for "best co-actor" and "best co-actress"

National Film Awards
 Won Best co-actor Elias Kanchan 2004
 Won Best co-actress Campa 2004

Meril Prothom Alo Awards

Other achievements
 Won Best Film: Impress Telefilm Ltd. 2005
 Won Best Actor: Riaz 2005
 Won Best Actress: Purnima 2005
 Won Best Music Director: Khandokar Nurul Alam and Imon Shaha

Golden Jubilee Film Audience Awards
 Won Best Film: Impress Telefilm Ltd. 2005

MusicShasti'''s music directors are Imon Saha and Khandokar Nurul Alam. Two, 'Tui Chhara Amar Chkhe' and 'Moirechhere Moirechhere' have lyric by Mohammad Rafikuzzam. Some songs are from Rabindra Sangeet. Playback singer are Sabina Yasmin, Andrew Kishore, Sadi Mohammad and Rezwana Chowdhury Banya.

Soundtrack

References

External links
 

2004 films
2004 drama films
Bengali-language Bangladeshi films
Bangladeshi drama films
Films based on Bengali novels
Films scored by Khandaker Nurul Alam
Films scored by Emon Saha
Films based on works by Rabindranath Tagore
Memorials to Rabindranath Tagore
2000s Bengali-language films
Best Film Bachsas Award winners
Impress Telefilm films